Edmond Patrick Charles Cotter (24 September 1904 – 8 March 1996) was a croquet player from Ireland. Cotter was one of the most successful croquet players in the 1950s and 1960s winning the President's Cup six times (1949, 1950, 1952, 1953, 1956 and 1960), the Open Championship three times (1955, 1958 and 1962) and the Men's Championship four times (1952, 1954, 1963 and 1969).  He also won the Open Doubles Championship on ten occasions (1954, 1955, 1958, 1959, 1961–1965 and 1969) on each occasion being partnered by John Solomon.

Cotter represented England in two MacRobertson Shield tournaments, winning on both occasions.

In 2009 Cotter was inducted into the World Croquet Federation Hall of Fame.

Cotter was a scholar at Christ Church, Oxford (1923–1927), where he was awarded the 1924 Gaisford Prize for Greek Verse.

Cotter was a schoolmaster at St Paul's school, Hammersmith, where he taught Latin and Greek. Cotter was also an international bridge player, who wrote a weekly article on bridge for the Financial Times and a monthly one for Country Life. He was in the 1937/38 winning team in the Bridge Great Britain Gold Cup. He also wrote a weekly crossword competition in The Times, and also a fine golfer.

Career statistics

Works
 Tackle Croquet This Way (Stanley Paul & Co Ltd, 1960)
 Bridge Play Technique (Robert Hale Ltd, 1982) 
 Contract Bridge (The teach yourself books) 
 Tackle Bridge (Stanley Paul & Co Ltd, 1973) 
 Financial Times Book of Bridge (Robert Hale Ltd, 1977)

References

External links
The Croquet Records site

1904 births
1996 deaths
Irish croquet players
Alumni of Christ Church, Oxford